The Melbourne International Exhibition is the eighth World's fair officially recognised by the Bureau International des Expositions (BIE) and the first official World's Fair in the Southern Hemisphere.

Preparations

After being granted self-governance, Victoria (in 1851) and New South Wales (in 1856), saw a steady economic growth as result of the discovery and exploitation of gold reserves. This growth during the 1850s and 1860s led to rivalry between their respective capitals Melbourne and Sydney. In the 1870s the focus turned to the outside world and proposals were made for organising an exhibition modelled on the great exhibitions of Europe, with an aim to promote commerce and industry, along with art, science and education. 
Melbourne started preparations in 1879 and filed a plan to the Parliament.  Melbourne's rival Sydney, the older of the two cities, wanted to be the first and organised an exhibition in record time.  
This Sydney International Exhibition started in October 1879, but it focused mainly on agriculture, so it was not really universal and therefore did not meet the criteria for official recognition by the BIE. Melbourne decided to start their exhibition shortly after the one in Sydney, so the participants could transport their exhibits during the winter of 1880.

In May 1878, the designs of Joseph Reed and Frederick Barnes were chosen for the Main Building of the Exhibition.  On 19 February 1879 Governor Sir George Bowen laid the cornerstone in Carlton Garden for the new Exhibition Building. The building, built by David Mitchell, covered about 7 acres.  Its nave measured 500 x 160 feet and the transept was 272 feet long. A large dome 60 feet in diameter rose 217 feet above the building.  Two machinery annexes, each 460 x 138 feet, were built at the rear of the main building.

Exhibition

The Melbourne International Exhibition was held from 1 October 1880 until 30 April 1881. It was the second international exhibition to be held in Australia, the first being held the previous year in Sydney. 1.459 million people visited the exhibition, made a profit of £1,570. The exhibition was also opened for entertainment and tourism.

Aftermath 
The building was extended and reused in 1888 as venue for the Melbourne Centennial Exhibition, celebrating the founding of European settlement in Sydney in 1788. The main building or Great Hall as it became known has been used for exhibitions, balls, banquets, and during World War II was used by the Royal Australian Air Force.  On 1 October 1980 it was announced that Her Majesty Queen Elizabeth II had conferred the title of "Royal" to the Exhibition Building.  On 1 July 2004 the Royal Exhibition Building became the first building in Australia to become a World Heritage Site.

See also
Adelaide International Jubilee Exhibition of 1887
Sydney International Exhibition
Melbourne Centennial Exhibition
Bob the Railway Dog
Garnet Walch

References

External links
Official website of the BIE
The Age Annual: A Political & Statistical Register of the Colony of Victoria. Melbourne International Exhibition Opened October 1, 1880. pp. 87–95.
 The Age Annual: A Political and Statistical Register of the Colony of Victoria

1880 in Australia
1881 in Australia
World's fairs in Melbourne
Festivals established in 1880
1880 establishments in Australia
1881 disestablishments in Australia
1880s in Melbourne